SS Admiral was an excursion steamboat operating on the Mississippi River from the Port of St. Louis, Missouri from 1940 to 1978. The ship was briefly re-purposed as an amusement center in 1987 and converted to a gambling venue called President Casino, also known as Admiral Casino, in the 1990s. The boat was dismantled for scrap metal starting in 2011.

Origin
The SS Admiral descended from the SS Albatross, a ferry for heavy vehicles owned by the Yazoo and Mississippi Valley Railroad.  With no bridge over the Mississippi River at Vicksburg, Mississippi, the railroads accessed a pair of transfer ships to shuttle railcars across. Albatross was fitted with rails built onto the deck, allowing railcars to roll onto the ship, ride a short distance aboard the ferry, then roll over to tracks on the opposite shore after the river crossing was completed. A bridge completed in 1930 rendered the Albatross obsolete for its intended purpose, retiring it from ferry service after 23 years.

Rebuild
Streckfus Steamers, a company which ran excursion boats along the Mississippi and Ohio Rivers, acquired the metal-hulled sidewheeler, Albatross, in 1935. The company refitted the steamer with a five-story, steel superstructure. The Art Deco exterior was designed by Mazie Krebs for Captain Joe Streckfus in 1933. The young Krebs was a fashion illustrator for the St. Louis department store Famous-Barr, and neither she nor Streckfus originally took the design seriously, but she would also design another vessel for Streckfus, SS President, in 1934.

From 1938 to 1940, Streckfus Company rebuilt for more than  a ship with five decks, two of which were air-conditioned, an unheard-of luxury. Her steel hull was divided into 74 compartments, of which up to 11 could be flooded with the ship still remaining afloat.  The new steel framework was designed and fabricated by Banner Iron Works.  The two massive piston shafts that drove the side paddle wheels were nicknamed Popeye and Wimpy and were visible from the lower deck.

Excursion business

The SS Admiral departed on her first excursion cruise from the St. Louis waterfront in June 1940. The steamer could carry as many as 4400 passengers. Among the ship's many amenities included food service, a large ballroom, and a lido deck. When Streckfus Steamers started excursions on the SS Admiral, they ran many all-day excursions but, later on, the market shifted toward shorter trips. Gangplanks led to the first deck, where popcorn was sold, and later, the company added a souvenir stand.

The second and third decks were both air-conditioned, and together, these levels were called the "Cabin." A large ballroomwith a capacity of about 2,000occupied most of the second deck, overlooked by ceiling tiles decorated with signs of the zodiac. Tables and booths were all around the ballroom, and there was a bandstand for live music. The second deck also included a bar and a concession stand. The third deck, also known as the mezzanine level, was surrounded by large windows and featured several dining and lounge areas. A large powder room on the mezzanine was named and styled for Greta Garbo. Interior furnishings and other decorations were designed in the Art Deco mode.

The frame of the fourth level housed unglazed windows, creating a partly open-air deck. The main kitchen was located there, as well as a large lounge and dining area, with a cafeteria and a soda jerk. The top deck, or "lido deck," was the only place on the Admiral available for completely open-air lounging. With unobstructed views, this was a vantage point for the St. Louis Arch, the top-terraced homes on the Chouteau's Bluff, the Eads Bridge, the Martin Luther King Bridge and the Jefferson Barracks Bridge. Several coin-operated telescopes facilitated close-up views. The pilothouse, whistles, lights, and the ship's calliope were also located on the lido deck. The vessel was nearby when the Arch was completed in October 1965 with installation of its final link.

In 1973, Streckfus Steamers converted the Admiral from steam to diesel power. The shafts for the paddlewheels were cut and removed to make way for port and starboard diesel propellers. The side-propellers and a stern-mounted propeller were all run by large Caterpillar engines.

Stationary entertainment venue
In 1979, the United States Coast Guard condemned the hull of the Admiral and prohibited the ship from plying the Mississippi. Connelly sent the Admiral to Kentucky for repairs. A subsidiary of Six Flags, Six Flags Admiral Corporation, acquired the Admiral and became the new general partner of SS Admiral Partners. The new ownership group invested  million in the latest renovation:  million in private funds and  million from a federal grant. The fourth and fifth decks were converted to enclosed facilities. The ship was painted silver. A theater was added to the complex, along with a stationary multi-level docking facility. Several restaurants and a sports bar were located in the retired ship. The partnership decided not to undergo the expense of a dry dock inspection, but later replaced structural deficiencies. This, together with faulty construction and problems with labor, resulted in final capital costs of  million, or  million over the original estimate.

The Admiral opened as an entertainment center in 1987, featuring several music venues, a restaurant, and the "Birdland Theater," a set of fourteen animated, mechanical birds which played music. The venture missed a payment on its electricity bill in November of that year.

Casino
After the early 1990s, it was operated from moorings near Eads Bridge as the President Casino Laclede's Landing. It had 1,230 slot machines, 59 gaming tables, 18 restrooms, and one restaurant.

Barge collision
Eight barges broke away from the tow and drifted back through the Missouri span. Three of these barges drifted toward Admiral. The drifting barges struck Admiral, causing 8 of its 10 mooring lines to break. Admiral then rotated clockwise downriver, away from the Missouri riverbank. The captain of Anne Holly disengaged his vessel from the six remaining barges in the tow and placed Anne Hollys bow against Admirals bow to hold it against the bank. About the time Anne Holly began pushing against Admiral, Admirals next-to-last mooring line parted. Anne Holly and the single mooring wire that remained attached to Admirals stern anchor held Admiral near the Missouri bank. No deaths resulted from the accident; 50 people were examined for minor injuries. Of those examined, 16 were sent to local hospitals for further treatment. Damages were estimated at  million (equivalent to  million in ). With the motorless Admiral wedged against the bank, rescue boats worked for hours shuttling about 2,500 people to safety.

21st-century history

In June 2005, it was reported that Columbia Sussex Corp. wanted to buy the President Casino on Admiral and replace it with a new vessel.

In August 2008, Pinnacle Entertainment, the owner, was considering moving the boat north to the area near the Chain of Rocks Bridge. After the state refused to approve the deal, Pinnacle surrendered its gambling license and sold to St. Louis Marine in 2010. The top decks were removed, but further dismantlement was delayed due to the 2011 Mississippi River floods, which made it impossible to transport the vessel downstream under the Eads Bridge. The hull was then towed to Calvert City, Kentucky, where it was hauled out on the bank of the Tennessee River and scrapping was completed.

References

External links

 Look Back: The Admiral's Heyday, photos by St. Louis Post-Dispatch staff photographers
 "1973 St Louis flood, SS Admiral Steamboat 8MM", YouTube Video.
 "Admiral demolition.", YouTube Video.
 "Art Deco Vessels", PDF.

1940 ships
Art Deco ships
Casinos in the United States
History of St. Louis
Maritime incidents in 1998
Paddle steamers of the United States
Riverboat casinos
Ships built in St. Louis
Steamboats of the Mississippi River
Steamships of the United States